The 2012 Eliteserien promotion/relegation play-offs was the 39th time a spot in the Norwegian top flight was decided by play-off matches between top tier and second-level clubs.

At the end of the 2012 season, Fredrikstad and Stabæk were relegated directly to the 2013 1. divisjon, and was replaced by Start and Sarpsborg 08 who were directly promoted.

Background
The play-offs between Eliteserien and 1. divisjon have been held every year since 1972 with exceptions in 1994 and 2011. They take place for the two divisions following the conclusion of the regular season and are contested by the fourteenth-placed club in Eliteserien and the four clubs finishing below the automatic promotion places in 1. divisjon. The fixtures are determined by final league position – the first to knockout-rounds begins with the four teams in the 1. divisjon: 3rd v 6th and 4th v 5th, and the winner then play each other to determine who meet the Eliteserien club in the final.

Qualified teams
Five teams entered a play-off for the last Eliteserien spot for the 2013 season. These were:
 Sandnes Ulf (14th placed team in the Tippeligaen)
 Sandefjord (third placed team in the 1. divisjon)
 Mjøndalen (fourth placed team in the 1. divisjon)
 Bodø/Glimt (fifth placed team in the 1. divisjon)
 Ullensaker/Kisa (sixth placed team in the 1. divisjon)

The four 1. divisjon teams first played a single game knockout tournament, with the winner (Ullensaker/Kisa) advancing to a two-legged tie against the Eliteserien team (Sandnes Ulf) for the 16th and final spot in the 2013 Eliteserien season. Sandnes Ulf maintained their position in the top flight with a 7–1 win on aggregate against Ullensaker/Kisa.

Matches
The third to sixth-placed teams in 2012 1. divisjon took part in the promotion play-offs; these were single leg knockout matches, two semi-finals and a final. The winners of the second round, Ullensaker/Kisa, advanced to play the 14th placed team in Tippeligaen over two legs in the Eliteserien play-offs for a spot in the top flight the following season.

First round

Second round

Final
The 14th-placed team, Sandnes Ulf, took part in a two-legged play-off against Ullensaker/Kisa, the winners of the 2012 1. divisjon promotion play-offs, to decide who would play in the 2013 Tippeligaen.

First leg

Second leg

Sandnes Ulf won 7–1 on aggregate and maintained their position in the 2013 Tippeligaen; Ullensaker/Kisa remained in the 1. divisjon.

Bracket

Eliteserien play-offs
2012 in Norwegian football